Jamie Doyle (born 23 May 1985), is a Scottish football midfielder who plays for Leicester City FC.

Career

Doyle began his career with Leicester City making his senior debut against FC Barcelona in a pre season friendly. After a few loan spells at Canvey Island and failing to get regular first team football, he returned  home to Scotland in January 2004 to join Ayr United. He scored a goal on his debut for Ayr, in a 2–1 defeat away to Inverness CT. Doyle left Ayr in June 2005, and after 6 months without a club, he joined Albion Rovers. He stayed with the Coatbridge outfit for a year, making 34 appearances, before signing for Arbroath in January 2007 for a fee of £12,000. He only made 20 appearances for Arbroath, and dropped out of the senior game to sign for Junior side Glenafton Athletic.

After two years with Glenafton, Doyle took part in Clyde's open trials, and was rewarded with a one-year contract after impressing in a friendly with Partick Thistle. He terminated his contract in January 2010 after making seven appearances, returning to Junior football with Lanark United. Doyle later played for Cumnock Juniors, Pollok and Kirkintilloch Rob Roy before signing for Shettleston in October 2012.

On 12 October 2013 Jamie Doyle again terminated his contract with Junior Side Shotts Bon Accord due to unpaid wages.

He returned to Junior Side Shettleston again, after his released from Shotts Bon Accord.

References

External links

Living people
1985 births
Footballers from Glasgow
Scottish footballers
Leicester City F.C. players
Ayr United F.C. players
Albion Rovers F.C. players
Arbroath F.C. players
Glenafton Athletic F.C. players
Clyde F.C. players
Lanark United F.C. players
Cumnock Juniors F.C. players
Pollok F.C. players
Kirkintilloch Rob Roy F.C. players
Glasgow United F.C. players
Scottish Football League players
Scottish Junior Football Association players
Association football midfielders